Ekele Udojoh (born 29 September 1989) is a Nigerian footballer who currently plays for Malkiya Club of Bahrain. Ekele is a gifted attacker with good goal sense, strong and fast. He can play from any part of the attack.

References
 Profile at BDFA 

1989 births
Living people
Nigerian footballers
Nigerian expatriate footballers
Deportes La Serena footballers
Ekele Udojoh
C.S. Marítimo players
Expatriate footballers in Chile
Expatriate footballers in Thailand
Expatriate footballers in Portugal
Nigerian expatriate sportspeople in Chile
Nigerian expatriate sportspeople in Thailand
Nigerian expatriate sportspeople in Portugal
Malkiya Club players
Association football forwards
Babanawa F.C. players